Aleksandr Ponomarev (1918 – 1973) was a Soviet Ukrainian football player and manager

Aleksandr Ponomarev may also refer to:

 Aleksandr Ponomaryov (footballer, born 1986), Russian football player
 Alexander Evgenievich Ponomarev (born 1957), Russian artist
 Oleksandr Ponomariov (born 1973), Ukrainian singer
 Oleksandr Serhiyovych Ponomariov (born 1962), Ukrainian economist and politician